Thomas Moore Raworth (19 July 1938 – 8 February 2017) was an English-Irish poet, publisher, editor, and teacher who published over 40 books of poetry and prose during his life. His work has been translated and published in many countries. Raworth was a key figure in the British Poetry Revival.

Life and work

Early life
Raworth was born on 19 July 1938 in Bexleyheath, Kent, and grew up in Welling, the neighbouring town. His family maintained its strong Irish connections while he was growing up, something which would leave an impression on Raworth's sense of himself as a poet. His mother's family lived in the same house in Dublin as Seán O'Casey at the time that the playwright was working on Juno and the Paycock. When he was 52 years old, Raworth acquired an Irish passport.

He was educated at St. Stephen's Primary School, Welling, Kent (1943–1949); St Joseph's Academy, Blackheath, London S.E.3. (1949–1954); and at the University of Essex (1967–1970), where he earned a Master's degree in 1970. He left school at the age of sixteen and worked at a variety of jobs. According to Raworth: 

Beginning in the early 1960s, with the magazine called Outburst, Raworth started his professional publishing career, when he published a number of British and American poets including Ed Dorn, Allen Ginsberg, and LeRoi Jones. He also founded Matrix Press at this time, publishing small books by Dorn, David Ball, Piero Heliczer, and others. In 1965, while working as an operator at the international telephone exchange, Raworth and Barry Hall set up Goliard Press, which published, amongst others, Charles Olson's first British collection. These ventures into publishing made an important contribution to a new found British interest in the New American Poetry movement of the 1960s.

He was considered "a particularly transatlantic writer, living in the US for several years in the seventies". Furthermore, Raworth's connection to American poetry through his work as an editor and publisher, established his American reputation in the U.S., often considered unequalled by any other British poet of that time period.

Poetry and publications
Raworth's first book, The Relation Ship (1966), won the Alice Hunt Bartlett Prize. Raworth attended the University of Essex from 1967–70, under the aegis of Donald Davie who ran the literature department there. According to Raworth, he studied Spanish at the University of Essex, as he worked toward a B.A. in Latin American Literature. But after the first year, he transferred to the Masters program and in 1970 was awarded an M.A. in the Theory and Practice of Literary Translation.

In the 1970s, he worked in the United States and Mexico, first teaching in universities in Ohio, Chicago and Texas, and later living in San Francisco where he was involved with the Zephyrus Image press. After six years abroad he returned with his family to England in 1977 to take up the post of resident poet in King's College, Cambridge for a year.

Raworth's early poetry showed the influences of the Black Mountain and New York School poets, particularly Robert Creeley and John Ashbery, together with strands from European poetry (Apollinaire), Dada, and Surrealism. His 1974 book Ace showed that Raworth had moved to a more disjunctive style in his work. This style was reflected in short, unpunctuated lines that lead the reader into following multiple syntactic possibilities, and where it is "increasingly impossible to keep track of the profusion of meanings on offer." Raworth's "poetic line" can knit together anything from observations of the everyday to self-reflexive commentary on the acts of thinking and writing, to lifts from pulp fiction and film noir, to political satire:

What followed was a series of long poems in this particular mode —after Ace came Writing (composed 1975–77; published 1982), Catacoustics (composed 1978–81; published 1991) and West Wind (composed 1982–83; published 1984). Subsequent projects have extended this mode into a kaleidoscopic sequence of 14-line poems (not exactly "sonnets") that extended through "Sentenced to Death" (in Visible Shivers, 1987), Eternal Sections (1993) and Survival (1994).  Later collections include Clean & Well Lit (1996), Meadow (1999), Caller and Other Pieces (2007), and Let Baby Fall (2008).

Raworth's 550-page Collected Poems was published in 2003. Although a number of major poems still remained uncollected at the time, much of these uncollected works were, subsequently, published during the years since the Collected Poems appeared: beginning with Windmills in Flames (2010). Whatever didn’t make it into the latter publication, found its way into Structures from Motion and As When, both published in 2015. A book of Raworth's prose, Earn your Milk, was published in 2009. The latter included all of his uncollected prose, and included his "uncategorizable prose-work", long out-of-print: A Serial Biography (1969), which has been described as an "assembly of memoir and reportage."

Several boxes of Raworth's notebooks, typescripts, and correspondence (ca. 1968–1977) are held at the University of Connecticut's Dodd Research Center.

Reception and influence
Over the years, since his work began appearing in the 1960s, Raworth had more than 40 books of his own work published, including pamphlets of poetry, prose and translations. Raworth gave regular readings of his work throughout the course of his life, in Europe and the U.S. In time, he even gave readings in China and Mexico. He made a number of recordings and videos during the course of his career. Raworth's readings had their own "signature style," which was specifically noted for the speed of his delivery, something David Kaufmann has described as "breakneck speed."  Kaufmann writes that when Raworth "gives live readings, he runs roughshod over the line breaks, thus making it impossible for the reader to rest with what she has just heard."

Raworth was also interested in collaborative work.

In 1991, he was the first European writer in 30 years to be invited to teach at the University of Cape Town.

In 2007, Raworth was awarded the  prize for lifetime achievement, in Modena, Italy. Some of his other awards included the Cholmondeley Award, and the Philip Whalen Memorial Award.

His visual art consists mainly of drawings, collage and found object art and was exhibited in Italy, France, South Africa, and the United States.

As fellow poet Catherine Wagner has pointed out, Raworth was an "inventor of dozens of ingenious and provocative forms," and so was an important influence on a succession of poets that have followed him. At the time of his death, he was considered by many to be, arguably, the finest British poet of his generation.

Death
Raworth was plagued by ill health for most of his life. In the 1950s, he was one of the first patients ever to survive open heart surgery. In the autumn of 2016, he began cancer treatments, but on 23 January 2017 he wrote the final entry on his blog:

Raworth died on 8 February 2017 at the age of 78. He is survived by his wife Val Raworth who said: "Tom died this afternoon, peacefully, his family around him. A release from his sufferings."

See also

 Black Mountain poets
 British Poetry Revival
 Language Poetry
 New York School
 Children of Albion: Poetry of the Underground in Britain

References

External links
 Raworth at EPC (includes extensive bibliography)
 "Tom Raworth", 9th International Literature Festival Berlin
 Tom Raworth's Home Page
 "Add-Verse" a poetry-photo-video project Tom Raworth participated in
 Raworth archive at University of Connecticut
 David Ball biography at Smith College
 Raworth reads with Clark Coolidge & David Meltzer – note: use pull down menu to find this Chris Funkhouser recording of Raworth's reading in West Stockbridge, MA in March, 1995

1938 births
2017 deaths
British Poetry Revival
People from Bexleyheath
Fellows of King's College, Cambridge
Academic staff of the University of Cape Town
English male poets
21st-century English male writers